Hymn of Seoul(서울의 찬가) is a song performed by South Korean singer Patti Kim. This song is a symbol of Seoul. The song was released on 1969.

See also
 Hymn of Busan

References

1969 songs
South Korean songs
Songs about South Korea
Songs about cities
Works about Seoul